Super Soul Records is a record label founded by Ray Cappo (Better Than a Thousand, Shelter & Youth of Today) that was distributed through Roadrunner Records. Notable releases were by Shelter (The Purpose The Passion) and Vision of Disorder.

See also
 List of record labels

American record labels
Hardcore record labels